Atlas were a New Zealand rock band which was formed in 2005 and disbanded in late 2008.

Founding
In April 2005, in Hollywood, California, producer Hank Linderman (The Beach Boys, Eagles) introduced New Zealand rocker Ben Campbell (a former member of the band Zed) and his sister Beth Campbell (a backing vocalist for the band Chicago), to 19-year-old American solo artist Sean Cunningham. Together with Joe McCallum, the group decided to form the band Atlas.

Located in Auckland, New Zealand, Atlas released their second single "Crawl" in March, 2007, and on 5 March, "Crawl" debuted at #9 before moving up to claim the top spot of the Official New Zealand Music Chart the next week, where it stayed for a total of seven weeks. Their next single was "Magic 8".

Atlas released their debut album Reasons for Voyaging on 19 November 2007, entering the Official New Zealand Music Chart the following week at #4, which was its peak position.

Discography

Singles

References

External links
Official MySpace

New Zealand alternative rock groups
Musical groups established in 2005
Musical groups disestablished in 2008